Hi-Rez Studios is an American video game company. The company was established in 2005 by Erez Goren and Todd Harris. Hi-Rez Studios' games include the squad-based shooter Global Agenda, the critically acclaimed Tribes: Ascend, the third-person MOBA Smite, the hero shooter Paladins, and the third-person shooter Rogue Company. In 2012, Hi-Rez Studios was recognized as a Top 30 Video-Game Developer by Game Developer Magazine and Gamasutra. Hi-Rez are the current owners of the Metaltech license, including Battledrome, Earthsiege, Starsiege, the CyberStorm series, and the Tribes series. With the exception of Battledrome and CyberStorm, the games were released as freeware by Hi-Rez on October 30, 2015.

History
Erez Goren founded Hi-Rez Studios with Todd Harris in 2005. They hired experienced game developers from other successful titles, including City of Heroes, The Elder Scrolls IV: Oblivion, and Call of Duty. Hi-Rez Studios employs more than 450 people at its development facility in the northern Atlanta suburb of Alpharetta, Seattle, and Brighton in the UK. In August 2018, the company split into four separate studios: Titan Forge (responsible for SMITE development), Evil Mojo (responsible for Paladins development), Heroic Leap (responsible for Realm Royale development. This studio later merged with Evil Mojo), and Alacrity Arthouse (responsible for Centralized Art Services).

In 2019, Hi-Rez Studios announced the creation of a new studio, Red Beard Games, based in the Brighton office. The team is currently working on Divine Knockout.

Games developed

Global Agenda
Global Agenda is an online team-based game. The game went live on February 1, 2010. In April 2011, Global Agenda became the first free-to-play game released on the Steam platform, introducing Elite and Free Agents and an in-game cash shop featuring Agenda Points.

Tribes Universe
Tribes Universe was a multiplayer arena shooter developed by Hi-Rez Studios based on the Tribes series. The game, along with Hi-Rez Studios' Tribes intellectual property acquisition from InstantAction, was first announced on October 23, 2010. While alpha testing was said to begin at the start of 2011, development on Tribes Universe was canceled when Hi-Rez Studios decided to start working on Tribes: Ascend.

Tribes: Ascend
Tribes: Ascend is a free-to-play multiplayer-only first-person shooter and part of the Tribes franchise. It was announced by Hi-Rez Studios on March 11, 2011, at the PAX East, and released on April 12, 2012. Tribes: Ascend earned a metascore of 86, and PC Gamer ranked it at #8 in an article on the Best Shooters of All Time. Aspects from previous Tribes games such as jetpacks and skiing are featured in the game.

Hi-Rez Studios representative Todd Harris announced the company's abandonment of the game on July 12, 2013.

Smite
Smite is a free-to-play third-person MOBA for Microsoft Windows, Xbox One, PlayStation 4, Nintendo Switch, and OS X. Players take on the visage of mythological deities from different pantheons and take part in arena combat, using powers and team tactics against other player-controlled deities and non-player controlled minions. Hi-Rez Studios announced Smite on April 21, 2011, at PAX East, and began its closed beta period on May 31, 2012, for PC. An open beta followed on January 24, 2013. The beta process produced more than 74 million hours of playtime and a large competitive community. Throughout the beta, Hi-Rez Studios also hosted a series of LAN and online events with cash prize pools. Smite was officially released in North America and Western Europe on March 25, 2014, for the PC. On August 19, 2015, Hi-Rez Studios released the Xbox One version, and on May 31, 2016, the PlayStation 4 version was released. On February 19, 2019, the Nintendo Switch version was released.

Paladins 
Paladins is a free-to-play online team-based game. The player has to pick a champion each with unique abilities to fight. There are four types of groups: Damage, Support, Flank and Front Line. The current version of the card system permits pre-designed loadouts that provide augments to various abilities and stats, as well as “items" that can be purchased by credits. To get credits the player has to play and fight others. Items can be upgraded mid-match to provide additional performance bonuses.The game was announced on August 5, 2015. Paladins went into open beta on September 16, 2016, and released on Steam as an early access title the same day.

Rogue Company
Rogue Company is a free-to-play multiplayer third-person shooter video game developed by First Watch Games. Rogue Company entered closed beta in June 2020 on Nintendo Switch, PlayStation 4, Xbox One, and on Microsoft Windows via the Epic Games Store, and included full support for cross-platform play and cross-progression.

Jetpack Fighter
Jetpack Fighter is a free-to-play high speed platformer for mobile. The game was released first for iOS on January 7, 2016, and Apple editors featured it as a Best New Game. As of July 27, 2016, the game has been released on Android. The game has earned a metascore of 83.

Divine Knockout
Divine Knockout (DKO, for short) is a third-person platform fighter developed by Red Beard Games, in Brighton. DKO started its closed Alpha in early 2022 and on November 22nd, 2022, announced that the game release date is going to be December 6th where the game is going to be available for PC (through Steam and Epic), Xbox One and Series X|S, PlayStation 4 and 5. On November 30th, 2022, Hi-Rez announced a partnership with PlayStation, where Divine Knockout's Founders Edition is included with PlayStation Plus during the month of December, 2022. The game was released on Steam, Epic Games Store, PlayStation, and Xbox on December 6, 2022.

References

External links
 Official website

2005 establishments in Georgia (U.S. state)
American companies established in 2005
Companies based in Fulton County, Georgia
Video game companies established in 2005
Video game companies of the United States
Video game development companies
Privately held companies based in Georgia (U.S. state)